Ten Brink is a Dutch toponymic surname originally meaning "at the village green". Variations include Ten Brinke and Tenbrink. People with this name include

Bernhard Egidius Konrad ten Brink (1841-1892) Dutch-born German philologist
Conrad ten Brink (1875-1938), Australian rules footballer
Jan ten Brink (1834-1901), Dutch writer
 (1838–1889), Dutch composer active in France
Robert ten Brink (born 1955), Dutch television personality
Ashton Tenbrink (born 1768), Dutch general in the Boer Wars

See also
Van den Brink, Dutch surname with a similar origin
Brink (surname)

References

Dutch-language surnames
Toponymic surnames